This is a list of Iranian football transfers for the 2020–21 winter transfer window. Only moves from Persian Gulf Pro League are listed.
Players without a club may join at any time. This list includes transfers featuring at least one Iran Football League club which were completed after the end of the summer 2020 transfer window on 19 November 2020 and before the end of the 2020–21 winter window.

Rules and regulations 
According to Iran Football Federation rules for 2020–21 Persian Gulf Pro League, each Football Club is allowed to take up to maximum 7 new Iranian player from the other clubs who already played in the 2020–21 Persian Gulf Pro League season.

Persian Gulf Pro League

Aluminium 

In:

Out:

Esteghlal 

In:

Out:

Foolad 

In:

Out:

Gol Gohar 

In:

Out:

Machine Sazi 

In:

Out:

Mes Rafsanjan 

In:

Out:

Naft Masjed-Soleyman 

In:

Out:

Nassaji 

In:

Out:

Paykan 

In:

Out:

Persepolis 

In:

Out:

Saipa 

In:

Out:

Sanat Naft 

In:

Out:

Shahr Khodro 

In:

Out:

Sepahan 

In:

Out:

Tractor 

In:

Out:

Zob Ahan 

In:

Out:

Notes and references

Football transfers winter 2020–21
2020-21
Transfers